Kim Chi-beom (born 21 February 1981) is a South Korean cyclist. He competed in the men's sprint at the 2004 Summer Olympics.

References

1981 births
Living people
South Korean male cyclists
Olympic cyclists of South Korea
Cyclists at the 2004 Summer Olympics
Place of birth missing (living people)
Cyclists at the 2002 Asian Games
Asian Games medalists in cycling
Medalists at the 2002 Asian Games
Asian Games silver medalists for South Korea
Asian Games bronze medalists for South Korea